

1931–1935: The USS Macon years

1935–1943: Army Air Corps Training Base Sunnyvale, CA

1942–1947: WWII Blimps and Gas Balloon operations

1943–1953: Naval Patrol heavier than air operations

1945–1967: NATS, MATS & MAC

1953–1963: US Navy's first Master Jet base – Carrier Squadrons

1963–1994: US Navy's West Coast P-3 Orion Center

Current

See also
 List of United States Navy aircraft squadrons
 List of inactive United States Navy aircraft squadrons
 List of United States Navy aircraft designations (pre-1962)

Moffett Federal Airfield